Yashodhara Rural Municipality (Nepali :यसोधरा गाउँपालिका) is a Gaunpalika in Kaplivastu District in Lumbini Province of Nepal. On 12 March 2017, the government of Nepal implemented a new local administrative structure, with the implementation of the new local administrative structure, VDCs have been replaced with municipal and Village Councils. Yashodhara is one of these 753 local units.

References 

Populated places in Kapilvastu District
Rural municipalities of Nepal established in 2017
Rural municipalities in Kapilvastu District